Scott Lipsky (born August 14, 1981 in Merrick, New York) is an American former professional tennis player and coach. As a player, Lipsky was primarily a doubles specialist.

As a junior, Lipsky was ranked No. 1 in the U.S. in singles in 1995, and No. 1 in doubles for three straight years, in 1995–97. He won USTA national singles championships at both the 1995 Boys' 14s Clay Court Championships and the 1997 Boys' 16s Clay Court Championships. In doubles, he and Jeremy Wurtzman won the USTA national 1996 and 1997 Boys' 16s Championships, and the 1999 Boys' 18s Clay Court Championships. After losing only one match in high school in New York, he was a three-time All-American for Stanford University, playing both singles and doubles. His Stanford team won the NCAA team championship in 2000, and he and teammate David Martin finished their college career ranked as the No. 2 doubles team in the nation. His current doubles partner is Treat Huey from the Philippines

Lipsky turned professional in 2003. He won his first Grand Slam title in 2011, winning the mixed doubles title at the French Open. He reached his career high world ranking in doubles, no. 21, in 2013.

Lipsky currently is the head coach of the tennis programs at St. Margaret's Episcopal School in San Juan Capistrano, California, a position he has held since July 2018.

Personal and early life
Lipsky's mother, Gail, is a psychologist.  His father, Marc, died suddenly in 2001 during his freshman year in college.  His grandfather, Jack Sherry, was no. 2 in the world in table tennis.  Lipsky is Jewish.

He began hitting tennis balls against a wall at home at age five. He received formal lessons at the Mid-Island Indoor Tennis Courts in Westbury, New York, and later at the Port Washington Tennis Academy. He also trained in Glen Cove, New York, at Robbie Wagner's Tournament Training Center.  As a teenager, he played for a couple hours almost every day.

Lipsky attended Birch Elementary School in Merrick, New York, and Merrick Avenue Middle School. He went to high school at John F. Kennedy High School in Bellmore, New York, where his tennis coach was Alan Fleishman.  He lost only one match in his high school tennis career for the Cougars.  He graduated in 1999. He was a three-time New York State high school tennis champion and won a gold medal for the Long Island team at the Junior Maccabi Games. On the academic side, he was a member of the National Honor Society.

Lipsky married Marie in July 2010. He currently resides in Huntington Beach, California.

Career

Juniors

Lipsky won the 1995 United States Tennis Association (USTA) Boys’ 14s Clay Court Championships in singles.  At the age of 16, he was ranked # 1 in the U.S. in singles (defeating Andy Roddick for the 1995 U.S. Junior Open Championship).  He was also ranked # 1 in singles in the 1997 USTA Boys’ 16s.  He won the singles championship at the 1997 USTA National Boys’ 16s Clay Court Championships.

Lipsky was also ranked # 1 in doubles for three straight years, in 1995–97, among the more than 10,000 boys in the USTA's boy's division.  He and Jeremy Wurtzman played doubles together and won three USTA National Clay Court Championships; the 1996 and 1997 USTA National Boys’ 16s Championships, and the 1999 USTA National Boys’ 18s Clay Court Championships.

College (1999–2003)
Lipsky attended Stanford University, graduating with a 3.0 GPA and a degree in American Studies.   He won All-American honors three times between 1999 and 2003, was a member of the NCAA team champions in 2000, and reached the NCAA doubles finals in 2002 and semi-finals in 2001 and 2003.  He first teamed up with David Martin in doubles in college. They finished their college career ranked as the # 2 team in the nation, and they extended their partnership into their pro careers.

He also occasionally played first singles at Stanford.  In November 2001, Lipsky won the Northern California Regional Singles Championship.

2003–06
Lipsky and Martin won the doubles title at the Laguna Niguel, California Futures tournament in September 2003, as well as a Futures tournament in Mexico in October 2003.

In 2004, he won the first pro singles title of his career at the USTA Futures event in Yuba City, California, without dropping a set. In doubles, he and Martin won a number of doubles titles:  the USTA Futures events in Costa Mesa, California (without dropping a set), Vero Beach, Florida (without dropping a set), and Key Biscayne, Florida (without dropping a set), the Japan F3 Futures event in Tokyo, Japan (without dropping a set), the Japan F1 Futures event in Kofu, Japan, and the Mexico F1 Futures in Chetumal, Mexico (without dropping a set), as well as a doubles titles in Harlingen, Texas (without dropping a set).  He also won a doubles title with Lesley Joseph at the USTA Futures event in Auburn, California.

In 2005, he and Martin won doubles titles at USTA Futures events in Costa Mesa, California, McAllen, Texas, and Harlingen, Texas (without dropping a set).  Lipsky also won doubles titles at the Togliatti Challenger in Russia (with Mark Nielsen; without dropping a set), the Little Rock, Arkansas Futures (with Tres Davis), the New Zealand F1 Futures in Hamilton, New Zealand (with Alexander Hartman), and the Great Britain F2 Futures event in Devon, Great Britain (with Brian Wilson; without dropping a set).  In singles, he lost in the finals of the November Waikoloa, Hawaii, tournament to Wayne Odesnik.

In 2006, he played singles and doubles for the New York Buzz in World Team Tennis.  In February, he lost in the finals of the New Zealand F1 tournament to Konstantinos Economidis of Greece.  In doubles, in May he and Todd Widom won a tournament in Busan, Korea, in September he and Chris Drake won a tournament in Lubbock, Texas, and he and Martin won tournaments in Nashville, Tennessee, in Binghamton, New York, in Yuba City, California, and in Wollongong, New South Wales, Australia.

2007–08 
Lipsky and Martin qualified for the main draw at the 2007 Wimbledon tournament, where they lost in the third round. They then made the final of a tournament in Los Angeles, California, which was Lipsky's first ATP final. He broke into the top 100 in the world in doubles for the first time, ranking # 92 in February 2007.

Lipsky and Martin captured their first ATP title in February 2008 indoor on hard courts at the SAP Open in San Jose.  They defeated the number one ranked doubles team of Bob and Mike Bryan, 7–6 (4), 7–5, at HP Pavilion in a finals that matched former Stanford stars. They also won the Hilton Waikoloa Village USTA Challenger. Lipsky broke into the top 50 in the world in doubles for the first time, ranking # 46 in February 2008. In May 2008, they won the 2005 Costa Mesa Pro Futures Classic in Costa Mesa, California.  In singles, in June 2008 Lipsky defeated world # 94 Jérémy Chardy of France 7–5, 4–6, 6–3, in Halle, Germany.

2009–10

In January 2009 he and Martin won a tournament in Carson, California.  In April, May, and June 2009, Lipsky and American Eric Butorac won the Tallahassee Tennis Challenger, the Estoril Open in Portugal, and a tournament in Nottingham, Great Britain.  Then, playing with Rik de Voest of South Africa, Lipsky won the Levene Gouldin & Thompson Tennis Challenger in Binghamton, New York.

In February 2010, he and Martin won a tournament in Dallas, and in October they won a tournament in Rennes, France.

In Atlanta in July 2010, he and American Rajeev Ram won their first doubles title together, defeating Rohan Bopanna and Kristof Vliegen for the outdoor hard court Atlanta Tennis Championships.  The just-married Lipsky had arrived in Atlanta directly after his wedding, and said of his new wife: "She's pretty understanding. She wasn’t thrilled that I came out this week, but my ranking wasn’t as high as I needed it to be.... She allowed me to come."  In the semifinals, Lipsky and Ram had defeated John Isner and James Blake, 7–6 (5), 7–6 (5).  In November, they won a tournament in Eckental, Germany.

2011; Grand Slam title 

Lipsky started 2011 strong.  He won a tournament in Singapore with Martin, and partnering with Rajeev Ram in February took the indoor hard court San Jose Open (over Christopher Kas from Germany and Alexander Peya from Austria) and the outdoor hard court Delray Beach titles (over Alejandro Falla from Colombia and Xavier Malisse from Belgium). In March, he and Ram won the Challenger of Dallas.  He won a tournament in Athens, Greece, in April with Colin Fleming.

Lipsky then won his first ATP World Tour 500 title, teaming with Santiago González of Mexico in April.  They won the outdoor clay Barcelona Open, defeating the world # 1 Bryan brothers in the finals as they broke their 10-match winning streak, 5–7, 6–2, 12–10.  They also defeated top doubles teams Jürgen Melzer (# 8)/Nenad Zimonjić (# 4), 6–3, 6–2, and Max Mirnyi (# 6)/Daniel Nestor (# 3), 7–6 (4), 6–4.

He then played in the 2011 French Open in June 2011. Lipsky and his partner Casey Dellacqua of Australia caused a major upset in the mixed doubles, winning the championship and defeating defending champions Katarina Srebotnik and Nenad Zimonjić 7–6, 4–6, 10–7, despite being unseeded. It was Lipsky's first Grand Slam title.  They shared $145,000 in prize money.  Lipsky said: "You watch these matches on television, and you wish that someday you can be there. To be on this stage playing a Grand Slam final, and to come out with a win, and to say now for the rest of my life that I’m a Grand Slam champion, it's amazing."  In men's doubles, he advanced to his first-ever grand slam quarterfinal appearance, with Rajeev Ram.

He reached his career-high ranking in doubles, # 26, on July 4, 2011.

Grand Slam finals

Mixed Doubles: 1 (1–0)

ATP career finals

Doubles: 28 (16 titles, 12 runner-ups)

Doubles performance timeline

''Current till 2017 Wimbledon Championships.

See also
List of select Jewish tennis players

References

External links

 Lipsky Recent Match Results
 Lipsky World Ranking History
 Article on Scott Lipsky in Long Island Tennis Magazine
 Stanford bio
 

1981 births
Living people
American male tennis players
Jewish American sportspeople
Jewish tennis players
Sportspeople from Huntington Beach, California
People from Merrick, New York
Stanford Cardinal men's tennis players
Tennis people from California
Tennis people from New York (state)
Grand Slam (tennis) champions in mixed doubles
People from Bellmore, New York
John F. Kennedy High School (Bellmore, New York) alumni
French Open champions
21st-century American Jews